Munkhbayar Dorjsuren (born Dorjsürengiin Mönkhbayar, ; born July 9, 1969) is a Mongolian-German sport shooter. She was born in Ulaanbaatar, Mongolia, but moved to Germany and became a German citizen. She is the 1992 Olympic bronze medalist in the Women's 25 metre pistol for Mongolia and the 2008 Olympic bronze medalist in the same event for Germany. She competes in the 25 metre and 10 metre air pistol events.

Career

Mongolia
Dorjsuren has competed at six Summer Olympic Games. She represented Mongolia at the 1992 Summer Olympics, at the 1996 Summer Olympics, and at the 2000 Summer Olympics. At the 1992 Summer Olympics she won the bronze medal in the women's 25 metre pistol category. She won the 1998 ISSF World Shooting Championships in 10 metre air pistol for Mongolia.

Germany
She represented Germany at the 2004 Summer Olympics, at the 2008 Summer Olympics and at the 2012 Summer Olympics. She won the 2002 ISSF World Shooting Championships in 25 metre pistol while representing Germany. Dorjsuren won gold in the Milan leg of the 2009 ISSF World Cup, 25 metre pistol category.

As of 2009 she lived in Munich, Germany.

Citizenship change

After her participation in Sydney olympics in year 2000 Munkhbayar D. moved to Germany and in 2002 she has become German citizen. In June 2013 she requested to become Mongolian citizen again.

Results

References

External links
 
 
 

German female sport shooters
Monkhbayar
ISSF pistol shooters
1969 births
Living people
Shooters at the 1992 Summer Olympics
Shooters at the 1996 Summer Olympics
Shooters at the 2000 Summer Olympics
Shooters at the 2004 Summer Olympics
Shooters at the 2008 Summer Olympics
Shooters at the 2012 Summer Olympics
Monkhbayar
Olympic shooters of Germany
Monkhbayar
Olympic bronze medalists for Germany
Medalists at the 1992 Summer Olympics
Medalists at the 2008 Summer Olympics
Sportspeople from Ulaanbaatar
Mongolian emigrants to Germany
Naturalized citizens of Germany
Olympic medalists in shooting
Asian Games medalists in shooting
Shooters at the 1994 Asian Games
Shooters at the 1998 Asian Games
European Games competitors for Germany
Shooters at the 2015 European Games
Asian Games silver medalists for Mongolia
Asian Games bronze medalists for Mongolia
Medalists at the 1994 Asian Games
Medalists at the 1998 Asian Games